United States v. One Package of Japanese Pessaries, 86 F.2d 737 (2d Cir. 1936) (often just U.S. v. One Package), was an in rem  United States Court of Appeals case in the Second Circuit involving birth control.

Background
In 1873 Congress adopted the Comstock Act, which prohibited the importation or mailing of "obscene matter".  The law's definition of obscene matter included contraceptives or information about contraception.  In the 1930s, Margaret Sanger and the National Committee on Federal Legislation for Birth Control lobbied Congress to revise this law, but were unsuccessful.

The case
Dr. Hannah Stone, at one of Sanger's clinics, ordered a new type of diaphragm (a pessary) from a Japanese physician to be shipped from Tokyo to the United States.  Upon arrival in the United States the shipment was seized and confiscated under the Tariff Act of 1930, which had incorporated the anti-contraceptive provisions of the Comstock Act.

A lower court ruled against the government. When the government appealed to the United States Court of Appeals for the Second Circuit, the appellate court affirmed the lower court's ruling.  The appellate court held that the law could not be used to intercept shipments which originated from a doctor.  Judge Augustus Noble Hand wrote, in his decision:

See also
 Birth control movement in the United States

References

External links
 

Birth control law and case law
United States Court of Appeals for the Second Circuit cases
United States reproductive rights case law
United States civil forfeiture case law
1936 in United States case law
Birth control in the United States
United States in rem cases
Barrier contraception
Japan–United States relations